The 2007–08 USHL season is the 29th season of the United States Hockey League as an all-junior league. The regular season began on October 5, 2007, and concluded on April 5, 2008 with the regular season champion winning the Anderson Cup. This was the final season of operation for the Ohio Junior Blue Jackets after failing to find a suitable relocation arrangement.

The Clark Cup playoffs featured the top four teams from each division competing for the league title.

Regular season
Final Standings
Note: GP = Games played; W = Wins; L = Losses; OTL = Overtime losses; SL = Shootout losses; GF = Goals for; GA = Goals against; PTS = Points; x = clinched playoff berth; y = clinched division title; z = clinched league title

East Division

West Division

Clark Cup Playoffs

Players

Scoring Leaders

Leading Goaltenders

Awards
Coach of the Year: Steve Poapst Chicago Steel
Curt Hammer Award: Joey Miller Sioux City Musketeers
Defenseman of the Year: Blake Kessel Waterloo Black Hawks
Executive of the Year: Jim Kronschnabel Sioux City Musketeers
Forward of the Year: Jason Gregoire Lincoln Stars
General Manager of the Year: Mike Hastings Omaha Lancers
Goaltender of the Year: David Reekie Lincoln Stars
Organization of the Year: Indiana Ice
Player of the Year: Jason Gregoire Lincoln Stars
Rookie of the Year: Jack Connolly Sioux Falls Stampede
Scholar-Athlete of the Year: Matt Farris Sioux Falls Stampede

First Team All-Stars
 David Reekie (Goalie) Lincoln Stars
 Blake Kessel (Defense) Waterloo Black Hawks
 Matt Bartkowski (Defense) Lincoln Stars
 Jack Connolly (Forward) Sioux Falls Stampede
 Jason Gregoire (Forward) Lincoln Stars
 Barry Almeida (Forward) Omaha Lancers

Second Team All-Stars
 Drew Palmisano (Goalie) Omaha Lancers
 John Carlson (Defense) Indiana Ice
 Paul Carey (Defense) Indiana Ice
 John Kemp (Forward) Indiana Ice
 Eric Springer (Forward) Sioux Falls Stampede
 Jake Hansen (Forward) Sioux Falls Stampede

References

External links
 Official website of the United States Hockey League

USHL
United States Hockey League seasons